The 17th Worcester district is one of 160 state legislative districts for the Massachusetts House of Representatives. It is located in Central Massachusetts.

Democrat David LeBoeuf of Worcester has represented the district since 2019. He is running for reelection in the 2020 Massachusetts general election.

District profile 
As of the last redistricting in 2011, the district encompasses all of the town of Leicester, including the villages of Cherry Valley and Rochdale, and the southwestern portion of the city of Worcester, including the neighborhoods of Main South and Webster Square. It has maintained these boundaries since 1995.

Leicester is a small town and developing suburb. It contains the Leicester campus of Becker College and is over 90 percent non-Hispanic white The Worcester portion of the district is an urban section of New England's second largest city. It contains Clark University and has significant Latino, Asian, and Black communities.

 Leicester
 Worcester's Ward 7; and Worcester's Ward 8: Precincts 2, 3, and 4

The current district geographic boundary overlaps with those of the Massachusetts Senate's 1st Worcester and 2nd Worcester districts.

Former locations
 c. 1872: Auburn, Charlton, Southbridge, and Spencer

List of members representing the district 
 Gilbert C. Taft, circa 1859 
 Alfred S. Pinkerton, circa 1888 
 Michael J. Fitzgerald, circa 1920

Electoral history

Elections results from statewide races

See also
 Massachusetts General Court
 Massachusetts House of Representatives
 Other Worcester County districts of the Massachusetts House of Representatives: 1st, 2nd, 3rd, 4th, 5th, 6th, 7th, 8th, 9th, 10th, 11th, 12th, 13th, 14th, 15th, 16th, 18th
 Worcester County districts of the Massachusett Senate: 1st, 2nd; Hampshire, Franklin and Worcester; Middlesex and Worcester; Worcester, Hampden, Hampshire and Middlesex; Worcester and Middlesex; Worcester and Norfolk
 List of former districts of the Massachusetts House of Representatives

Images
Portraits of legislators

References

External links
 League of Women Voters of the Worcester Area

House Worcester 17
Government of Worcester, Massachusetts
Leicester, Massachusetts